The Socialist League was an early revolutionary socialist organisation in the United Kingdom. The organisation began as a dissident offshoot of the Social Democratic Federation of Henry Hyndman at the end of 1884. Never an ideologically harmonious group, by the 1890s the group had turned from socialism to anarchism, and disbanded in 1901.

Organizational history

Origins
Until March 1884, the members of the Democratic Federation, forerunner of the Social Democratic Federation (SDF), worked together in harmony. The new organisation had expected to make rapid headway with existing radical workingmen's organisations but few chose to join the SDF. Early enthusiasm gave way to disappointment and introspection. Personal relationships began to loom large among the small group's leading members. The personal vanity and domineering attitude of the organisation's founder, Henry Hyndman, along with his nationalism and fixation on parliamentary politics, were the leading causes of the internal acrimony.

By the end of 1884, a group of SDF members sought to remove Hyndman from his position as party leader in December Executive Council meetings. A resolution to censure Hyndman passed by a vote of 10 to 8. The anti-Hyndman dissidents handed in their prepared letter of resignation, believing the federation's lack of fraternal cooperation to be irreconcilable. The 10 seceding members of the old SDF Executive Council issued a statement To Socialists in January 1885 explaining their perspective.

Early in 1885, the secessionists established themselves in a new organisation called the Socialist League. Several SDF branches, such as those in East London, Hammersmith, and Leeds, joined the new group. In Scotland the Scottish Land and Labour League severed its connection with the SDF to join the new organisation. Several important individuals in the movement such as author Edward Carpenter and artist Walter Crane also chose to cast their lot with the fledgling Socialist League.

In February 1885 the new party established its official journal, a newspaper called Commonweal. This publication was initially published monthly but was soon converted into a weekly. Editor of the publication was William Morris, who paid the paper's operating deficit out of pocket.

Development
The Socialist League was a heterogeneous organisation, including Fabians, Christian Socialists, anarchists, and Marxist revolutionary socialists. While the Marxists tolerated the earnest ethical socialists, the anarchists concerned them, with memories of the role of the anarchist schism in the First International still fresh in their memory. Eleanor Marx was one of the Socialist League leaders who was particularly concerned about the place of the largely non-English anarchists in the new party.

The Socialist League was involved in the fight for the right of free speech in London during 1885 and 1886. Whereas religious organisations such as the Salvation Army were allowed to preach in the streets, the London Metropolitan Police banned the Socialists from similar activities. Members of the Socialist League and their rivals the SDF simply continued to speak and to incur fines, attracting public attention, until the authorities made the decision that their prosecution was counterproductive and stopped their interference. Thereafter, public interest in the street meetings rapidly evaporated.

While the political contributions of the tiny Socialist League were not measurable, it did have a lasting literary impact. The newspaper of the Socialist League, The Commonweal, provided the venue for first publication of a number of original writings, including the serialized novels of William Morris, Dream of John Ball and News from Nowhere.

In 1887, the League's membership split ideologically into three factions: anarchists, parliamentary-oriented socialists, and anti-parliamentary socialists.

Anarchist control

Around the middle of this same year, 1887, anarchists began to outnumber socialists in the Socialist League. The 3rd Annual Conference, held in London on 29 May 1887 marked the change, with a majority of the 24 delegates voting in favor of an anarchist-sponsored resolution declaring that "This conference endorses the policy of abstention from parliamentary action, hitherto pursued by the League, and sees no sufficient reason for altering it." Frederick Engels, living in London and a very interested observer in the League's affairs, saw William Morris' role as decisive. Morris, a benefactor of the Commonweal, declared on principle that he would quit if the League took any parliamentary action.

Many of the group's international socialists began to leave. In August 1888, the London branch of the Socialist League, which included Eleanor Marx and Edward Aveling, seceded in favor of establishing itself as an independent organization, the Bloomsbury Socialist Society. By the end of 1888 many other parliamentary-oriented individuals had exited the Socialist League to return to the SDF, with others who remained hostile to the SDF's parliamentary emphasis choosing to involve themselves in the burgeoning movement for so-called "New Unionism." As the socialist factions left, the anarchist faction solidified its hold on the organisation.

By 1889, the anarchist wing had completely captured the organisation. William Morris was stripped of the editorship of Commonweal in favor of Frank Kitz, an anarchist workman. Morris was left to foot the ongoing operating deficit of the publication, some £4 per week — this at a time when £150 per year was the average annual family income in the kingdom. By the autumn of 1890, Morris had had enough and he, too, withdrew from the Socialist League.

Disestablishment

The anarchist movement had newspapers of its own, including the journals Liberty and Freedom.

The William Morris Society "reformed" the Hammersmith branch for one day on the TUC March for the Alternative on 26 March 2011. The banner was paraded again on 20 October 2012.

Notable members

Secretaries
1885: John Lincoln Mahon
1885: Henry Halliday Sparling
1886: Henry Alfred Barker
1888: Fred Charles
1888: Frank Kitz
1890: ?

Other members

 Edward Aveling
 Eleanor Marx Aveling
 Ernest Belfort Bax
 Edward Carpenter

 Walter Crane
 Bruce Glasier
 Bill Holmes
 Tom Maguire

 Sam Mainwaring
 William Morris
 Andreas Scheu
 Raymond Unwin

Conferences of the Socialist League

{| class="wikitable"
|-
! Year
! Name
! Location
! Dates
! Delegates
|-
! 1885
| align="center" | 1st Annual Conference
| align="center" | Farringdon Hall, London
| align="center" | 5 July
| align="center" | 
|-
! 1886
| align="center" | Semi-Annual Conference
| align="center" | 
| align="center" | 25 January
| align="center" | 
|-
! 1886
| align="center" | 2nd Annual Conference
| align="center" | 
| align="center" | 13 June
| align="center" | 
|-
! 1887
| align="center" | 3rd Annual Conference
| align="center" | 13 Faringdon Road, London
| align="center" | 29 May
| align="center" | 24
|-
! 1888
| align="center" | 4th Annual Conference
| align="center" | 13 Faringdon Road, London
| align="center" | 20 May 
| align="center" | 
|-
! 1889
| align="center" | 5th Annual Conference
| align="center" | 
| align="center" | June
| align="center" | 
|-
! 1890
| align="center" | 6th Annual Conference
| align="center" | Communist Club, Tottenham Court Road, London
| align="center" | 25 May
| align="center" | 14
|-
|}
Data from International Institute of Social History, "Finding Aid for the Socialist League Archive," supplemented by Kapp, Eleanor Marx: Volume 2, passim   and Marx-Engels Collected Works, Volume 48, passim.

Footnotes

Bibliography

External links
Manifesto of the Socialist League, Commonweal, February 1885. William Morris Internet Archive, Marxists Internet Archive. Retrieved 14 September 2009.
Socialist League (UK) Archives, at the International Institute of Social History. Retrieved 19 May 2018.

 
1885 establishments in the United Kingdom
1901 disestablishments in the United Kingdom
Political parties established in 1885
Political parties disestablished in 1901
Anarchist organisations in the United Kingdom
Second International